The 2006–07 Ukrainian Cup was the 16th annual edition of Ukraine's football knockout competition, the Ukrainian Cup. The winner of this competition was Dynamo Kyiv which also was defending its title.

This season saw return of amateur teams to participate in the competition for the first time since 1995.

Team allocation 
Fifty-nine teams entered the competition

Distribution 

Note: Winner of the 2005 Amateur Cup of Ukraine FC Pivdenstal Yenakieve was replaced by FC Khimmash Korosten

Round and draw dates 
All draws held at FFU headquarters (Building of Football) in Kyiv unless stated otherwise.

Competition Schedule

First Round (1/32) 
The First Round took place on August 11, 2006. However, the match between Dniester Ovidiopol and Metalurh Donetsk took place on August 12. All clubs have participated besides Dynamo, Shakhtar, Chornomorets, Dnipro and Metalurh Z. that received a bye in this round.

Second round (1/16) 
The First Round took place on September 20, 2006. However, the match between Titan Armyansk and Vorskla Poltava took place on September 19; and between Khimik Krasnoperekopsk – Metalurh Donetsk was played on October 4, 2006.

Third Round (1/8) 
The second round matches took place on October 25, 2006.

Quarter-finals 
The matches took place from December 1, 2006 to December 10, 2006.

|}

First leg

Second leg

Semi-finals 
The semifinals took place on April 18, 2007 and May 9, 2007.

|}

First leg

Second leg

Final

Top goalscorers

See also 
 2006–07 Ukrainian Premier League
 2006–07 Ukrainian First League
 2006–07 Ukrainian Second League

References

External links 
Ukrainian Cup 2006–07 
Comprehensive information on the tournament

Ukrainian Cup seasons
Cup
Ukrainian Cup